Alexandra Jane Paul (born September 16, 1991) is a Canadian former competitive ice dancer. She teamed up with partner Mitchell Islam in 2009. They are the 2010 World Junior silver medalists, 2013 Nebelhorn Trophy bronze medalists, and three-time Canadian national bronze medalists (2011, 2014, 2015). They competed at the 2014 Winter Olympics.      They were married in September 2021.

Personal life 
Alexandra Paul was born on September 16, 1991, in Toronto. She has two sisters. Her father is a radiologist. She studied political science at Oakland University, completing her final semester in April 2017.

Career 

Alexandra Paul finished third with Jason Cheperdak in junior ice dancing at the 2009 Canadian Championships. She then began looking for a new partner and had a successful tryout in February 2009 with Mitchell Islam, a fellow skater at the Mariposa School of Skating in Barrie, Ontario.

Paul/Islam began competing together during the 2009–2010 season. In July 2009, they beat the Canadian junior champions at the Minto Summer Skate and were given a Junior Grand Prix assignment. They competed at two 2009–10 JGP events, finishing fourth in Poland and fifth in Turkey. They won gold at the Canadian Junior Championships and were assigned to Junior Worlds where they captured the silver medal.

Paul/Islam moved up to the senior ranks for the 2010–2011 season. They finished fourth in their senior Grand Prix debut at 2010 Skate Canada International. Their next event was 2010 Cup of Russia. They had a fall in the short dance and withdrew from the free dance after Paul sustained a rib injury. Paul/Islam made their senior national debut at the 2011 Canadian Championships, finishing in third. They were first alternates for the 2011 World Championships.

Paul sprained a knee ligament around 2011 or 2012.

Paul/Islam finished eighth at the 2011 Skate America. They withdrew before the free dance at 2011 NHK Trophy after placing seventh in the short — Paul suffered a cut to the back of the thigh in a collision with Italy's Lorenza Alessandrini / Simone Vaturi during the morning practice on November 12.

In June 2012, Paul/Islam decided to train full-time at the Detroit Skating Club in Bloomfield Hills, Michigan. They had no Grand Prix events in 2012. At the 2013 Canadian Championships, they finished fourth.

Paul/Islam began the following season with bronze at the 2013 Nebelhorn Trophy. They placed fifth at their sole Grand Prix assignment, the 2013 Skate Canada International. After winning the bronze medal at the 2014 Canadian Championships, they were assigned to the 2014 Winter Olympics in Sochi, where they placed 18th.

Paul/Islam ranked 8th in the short dance, 14th in the free dance, and 13th overall at the 2015 World Championships in Shanghai, China. A few weeks later, they changed coaches, joining Marie-France Dubreuil, Patrice Lauzon, and Romain Haguenauer at the Gadbois Centre in Montreal, Quebec.

Paul injured her hamstring in the summer of 2016. She and Islam received the bronze medal at the 2016 CS U.S. International Classic. On November 18, Paul twisted her knee when she fell during a morning practice at the 2016 Cup of China. The duo decided to withdraw from the competition before the short dance. They announced their competitive retirement on December 15, 2016.

Programs 
(with Mitchell Islam)

Competitive highlights 
GP: Grand Prix; CS: Challenger Series; JGP: Junior Grand Prix

With Islam

With Cheperdak

References

External links 

 
 Alexandra Paul / Mitchell Islam at Skate Canada
 

Canadian female ice dancers
1991 births
Living people
World Junior Figure Skating Championships medalists
Figure skaters from Toronto
Figure skaters at the 2014 Winter Olympics
Olympic figure skaters of Canada